George Denison may refer to:
George Denison (American politician) (1790–1831), United States Representative from Pennsylvania
George Denison (priest) (1805–1896), English churchman
George Denison (Canadian politician) (1822–1902)
George Taylor Denison (1783–1853), Canadian soldier and community leader
George Taylor Denison III (1839–1925), Canadian soldier and publicist

See also
George Dennison (1925–1987), American author
George M. Dennison (1935–2017), president of the University of Montana